Douglas Vivian Parson Wright (21 August 1914 – 13 November 1998) was an English cricketer. A leg-spinner for Kent and England from 1932 to 1957 he took a record seven hat-tricks in first-class cricket. He played for Kent for 19 seasons and was their first professional captain from late 1953 to 1956. Don Bradman said he was the best leg-spinner to tour Australia since Sydney Barnes, and Keith Miller thought he was the best leg-spinner he had seen apart from Bill O'Reilly. He toured Australia in 1946–47 and 1950–51, but was dogged by ill-luck and was considered to be the "unluckiest bowler in the world".

Cutting a leg-break is always dangerous, and cutting Wright is a form of suicide. Why a bowler of his skill failed to get more test-match wickets always mystified me; there was of course the marked tendency to bowl no-balls, but he sent down so many good ones, and worried and beat the batsmen so often, that he should have had better results...he seemed always likely to get wickets. It is one of the toughest problems of captaincy to know when to remove a man like that from the firing-line.
Johnnie Moyes

Early career 
His early career was restricted by the monopoly of Tich Freeman on Kent's bowling honours, but after Freeman's powers declined in 1936, Wright took his place. He did the hat-trick twice in 1937, and was picked to play for England in 1938. He bowled well on a dusty wicket at Headingley, although his figures were hurt by fielding errors, and that winter went to South Africa.

In 1939, Wright advanced so much that he was named one of the Wisden Cricketers of the Year and produced two sensational performances: sixteen for 80 against Somerset, and nine for 47 on a dusty wicket at Bristol, against Gloucestershire. Wright also batted well enough to score 490 runs, and had made 103 for once out in 1936 against Warwickshire, but his batting declined after World War II. Though he became fixed as a tail-ender, he did make 66 at number 11 in 1955 against Warwickshire. He served in the Army during World War II, and the loss of several of England's dry-wicket bowlers to the War meant he became an automatic choice for the 1946–47 Ashes series.

Australia 1946–47 
Wright was seen as England's trump card when he arrived in Australia, but had trouble with his no balls due to his odd run up "He waves his arms widely, and rocks on his legs like a small ship pitching and tossing in a fairly heavy sea. Whenever he bowls in Australia there are people who whistle and cat-call as he goes through his strange approach to the stumps." Jack Fingleton called the no-ball "Wright's curse...He's probably bowled more of these than any other spinner in history", "On at least four occasions he was convinced he had Bradman in his bag but it was not to be. Wright, I believe was very keen to secure such a verdict over Bradman, who only once has been dismissed l.b.w. during his Anglo-Australian Test career". In the end he was overbowled and expensive. Of particular note is that Wright was the biggest wicket-taker on either side with 23 wickets – five more than any other bowler – but with the high average of 43.04. He was also the chief first–class wicket-taker of the 1946–47 season – 51 wickets (33.31) – and bowled just over a third of England's overs in the Tests; 246.3 compared to 240.2 by Alec Bedser and 246.5 by the rest.

In the First Test at Brisbane he took 5/167 on a flat wicket in Australia's 645 and suffered in this and the next three Tests as the England captain Wally Hammond set stereotyped defensive fields and was loath to take advice. In the Second Test at Sydney Wright (1/169) “bowled beautifully with the most wretched luck”, in one over "On four occasions Hammond, usually most undemonstrative, threw his hands in the air as the ball beat Bradman and shaved the stumps, and in between these near dismissals there was a confident appeal for leg before wicket. "He continually rapped the pads with his straight one, and when the decision went against him, his face clouded with puzzled dismay." In the Third Test at Melbourne Bradman tried to hit a straight ball to leg, but missed and was hit on the top of his pads plumb in front of the stumps. Wright and Evans appealed, but Bradman was given not out. However, a cameraman took a series of photographs of the delivery and "the camera appears to give a different verdict".

Finally in the Fifth Test at Sydney Wright found things turning his way. The new captain Norman Yardley was keen to discuss field placings with his professional cricketers. He changed them as each batsmen came in and gave Wright a field of close catchers instead of trying to save runs.  At the start of each Test, Wright would receive telegrams and letters from well-wishers who had lamented his bad luck "Never a match went by in which he did not hopelessly defeat the defences of the leading run-getters. Times out of number he had Barnes, Bradman, Hassett and their like groping forward hypnotised by the magic of his spinning witchcraft". Wright bowled unchanged for nearly two hours and took the wickets of Don Bradman, who came down the wicket, misjudged the spin and bowled for 12, and Keith Miller taken by Jack Ikin at slip. Australia started the fourth day on 189/4 and Wright bowled unchanged for 11 overs. Alec Bedser shut up his end and conceded only 15 runs while Wright span his way through the Australian batting with a spell of 5/42 with Lindsay Hassett, Colin McCool, Don Tallon, Ray Lindwall and George Tribe all falling to catches close to the wicket. Wright finished with 7/105 and only Ron Hamence (31 not out) could play him. Australia were dismissed for 253, but England still lost the Test. The turning point was when Bill Edrich dropped Bradman off Wright in the second innings for 2, the Australian captain made 63, Wright was hit for 2/93 and Australia won by 5 wickets.

England 1947–50 
In 1947, with the dry pitches suiting him, proved Wright's best season as he took 177 wickets, including 10/175 against South Africa at Lord's. However, the following two years were plagued by injury and Wright did little in the Tests, but he showed many times that he was still the most dangerous English bowler in dry weather – especially in terms of ability to dismiss top batsmen.

Australia 1950–51 
Wright toured Australia again for the 1950-51 Ashes series, but still suffered from bad luck and no balls. In the First Test at Brisbane He bowled a typical over to Neil Harvey, with two long hops, which Harvey cracked into the square-leg fence, but then had him groping at a googly that turned so fiercely that it missed both bat and stumps, "a real pearl that morally bowled Harvey all the way". The following ball had Wright appealing for lbw, but it was turned down as it turned so much that it would have missed the stumps. In the final innings Wright was last man in at 77/9 with England needing another 115 runs to win. He helped Len Hutton add 45 runs for the last wicket, managing to hold a straight bat up to the few balls he was left to face until the last four balls from Jack Iverson before lunch. He kept out the first three, but spooned the last to Ray Lindwall at square leg and was out for 2. Batting again in the Third Test at Sydney Wright was run out for a duck by his Kent team-mate Godfrey Evans, tripping over his bat and pulling a muscle as he rushed home. As a result, he fielded only for a few overs before he had to retire from the game on the only spinning wicket of the series. With Trevor Bailey's thumb broken by Ray Lindwall England were reduced to three bowlers and lost by an innings. Wright recovered for the Fourth Test at Adelaide and took 4/99 with only Arthur Morris, a noted player of spin, able to master him. In the England innings he joined Len Hutton at 219/9 and made 14 of their last wicket stand of 53 as the Yorkshire batsman carried his bat for 156 not out.

Later Career 1951–57 
Wright ended the series with 11 wickets (45.45) and his Test career came to an end with 7 further wickets in New Zealand (25.57). In order to regain supremacy in international cricket, England captains began to change to tactics that emphasised reducing the ability for batsmen to score. In this context, Wright was an expensive luxury. In 1951 Wright was never at his best in a damp summer, and on the hard wickets of 1952 his wickets cost six runs more than in 1947 or 1949. However, in August 1953, Wright became Kent's first professional captain, and in contrast to Eric Hollies the job seemed to help his bowling, for in 1954 with pitches totally unsuited he took 105 wickets and in 1955 he had one of his best seasons. At the Oval he led Kent to an unexpected victory over Surrey when that county appeared certain to win. In 1956, however Wright did not take fifty wickets, though once against Middlesex he bowled at his best: Wisden commented, "most of his eight victims had not been born when Wright entered first-class cricket twenty-four years ago and they had no answer to his whipping leg-breaks and googlies".

At the beginning of 1957, Wright said he did not wish to be considered for the captaincy in his second benefit year, and in mid-July he decided to retire. A review of his career was provided in the article "Googly Bowlers and Captains Retire" in the 1958 Wisden. After retiring as a player, he became coach at Charterhouse School until 1971.

References

Cited sources
 Clif Cary (1948) Cricket Controversy, Test matches in Australia 1946–47, T. Werner Laurie Ltd.
 Jack Fingleton (1951) Brown and Company, The Tour in Australia, Collins.
 Bill O'Reilly (1951) Cricket Task-Force, The Story of the 1950–1951 Australian Tour, Werner Laurie
 E. W. Swanton (1975) Swanton in Australia with MCC 1946–1975, Fontana/Collins.

External links
 
 21 August down the years from Cricinfo
 DVP Wright Obituary from Cricinfo

1914 births
1998 deaths
English cricketers
England Test cricketers
Kent cricketers
Kent cricket captains
People from Sidcup
International Cavaliers cricketers
Players cricketers
Marylebone Cricket Club cricketers
North v South cricketers
British Army personnel of World War II
British Army officers
Military personnel from Kent